Henry Levai Severeid (June 1, 1891 – December 17, 1968) was an American professional baseball player and scout. He played as a catcher in Major League Baseball from 1911 to 1926, most notably as a member of the St. Louis Browns where, he was known for being one of the best defensive catchers of his era and a capable handler of pitching staffs. He also played for the Cincinnati Reds, St. Louis Browns, Washington Senators and the New York Yankees.

Biography
Severeid was born in Story City, Iowa to Norwegian immigrants Lars Severeid and Maria (Naess) Severeid. Three of his brothers, Oscar, Charles, and Elmer, played minor league ball. 

Severeid finished 6th in voting for the 1924 American League MVP for playing in 137 Games and having 432 At Bats, 37 Runs, 133 Hits, 23 Doubles, 2 Triples, 4 Home Runs, 48 RBI, 1 Stolen Base, 36 Walks, .308 Batting Average, .362 On-base percentage, .398 Slugging Percentage, 172 Total Bases and 31 Sacrifice Hits. 

On June 18, 1925, the Browns traded Severeid to the Washington Senators for George Mogridge and Pinky Hargrave.

He helped the Senators win the 1925 American League Pennant and the Yankees win the 1926 American League Pennant.

In 15 seasons he played in 1,390 Games and had 4,312 At Bats, 408 Runs, 1,245 Hits, 204 Doubles, 42 Triples, 17 Home Runs, 539 RBI, 35 Stolen Bases, 331 Walks, .289 Batting Average, .342 On-base percentage, .367 Slugging Percentage, 1,584 Total Bases and 125 Sacrifice Hits.  He is also the Baltimore Orioles Career Leader in At Bats per Strikeout (27.8).

Severeid spent over a quarter century as a scout, for the Chicago Cubs (1943) and Boston Red Sox from 1944. In 1941, he co-authored the book Play Ball! Advice for Young Ballplayers with Charles Edward Chapman (1880–1941). He died in San Antonio, Texas in 1968 at the age of 77.

References

Further reading
Play ball! : Advice for young ballplayers by Charles E. (Al) Chapman and Henry L. (Hank) Severeid with foreword by Bill McKechnie (New York: Harper & Brothers, c1941)

External links

1891 births
1968 deaths
American people of Norwegian descent
Baseball players from Iowa
Boston Red Sox scouts
Burlington Pathfinders players
Chicago Cubs scouts
Cincinnati Reds players
Galveston Buccaneers players
Hollywood Stars players
Longview Cannibals players
Louisville Colonels (minor league) players
Major League Baseball catchers
New York Yankees players
Ottumwa Packers players
People from Story City, Iowa
Sacramento Senators players
St. Louis Browns players
San Antonio Missions managers
San Antonio Missions players
Sioux City Packers players
Washington Senators (1901–1960) players
Waterloo Lulus players
Wichita Falls Spudders players